The philosophy of thermal and statistical physics is that part of the philosophy of physics whose subject matter is an amalgam of classical thermodynamics, statistical mechanics, and related theories. Its central questions include: What is entropy, and what does the second law of thermodynamics say about it? Does either thermodynamics or statistical mechanics contain an element of time-irreversibility? If so, what does statistical mechanics tell us about the arrow of time? What is the nature of the probabilities that appear in statistical mechanics?

See also 
 Laws of thermodynamics
 Maxwell's demon
 H-theorem
 Maximum entropy thermodynamics
 Entropy in thermodynamics and information theory

References 

 Uffink, J., 2001, "Bluff your way in the second law of thermodynamics," Studies in History and Philosophy of Modern Physics 32(3): 305–94.
 --------, 2007, "Compendium of the Foundations of Classical Statistical Physics" in Butterfield, J., and John Earman, eds., Philosophy of Physics, Part B. North Holland: 923–1074.
 Valev, P., 2002, "The Law of Self-Acting Machines and Irreversible Processes with reversible Replicas," in Sheehan, D., (ed.) Proceedings of the First International conference on Quantum Limits to the Second Law, American Institute of Physics: 430–35.
 Martinas et al., Thermodynamics: History And Philosophy - Facts, Trends, Debates
 Hoyer, Thermodynamics and Philosophy: Ludwig Boltzmann
 Sklar, Physics and Chance: Philosophical Issues in the Foundations of Statistical Mechanics
 Ernst & Hüttemann, Time, Chance, and Reduction: Philosophical Aspects of Statistical Mechanics

External links
 
 

 
Philosophy of physics